Dhaulagiri may refer to:
Dhaulagiri (mountain range), a mountain range in Nepal
Dhaulagiri, main peak of the Dhaulagiri mountain range
Dhaulagiri Zone, former administrative division 
Dhaulagiri Rural Municipality, a Gaunpalika in Myagdi District